The Dôme de Rochefort (4,015 m) is a mountain in the Mont Blanc massif in Haute-Savoie, France and of Aosta Valley, Italy.

See also

List of 4000 metre peaks of the Alps

References

Mountains of Haute-Savoie
Mountains of Aosta Valley
France–Italy border
International mountains of Europe
Alpine four-thousanders
Mountains of the Alps
Mont Blanc massif